Cyrtulus galatheae is a species of sea snail, a marine gastropod mollusk in the family Fasciolariidae, the spindle snails, the tulip snails and their allies.

Description

Distribution

References

 Powell A.W.B. (1967). Mollusca of the Kermadec Islands, Part 2. Records of the Auckland Institute and Museum. 6(3): 197-200.
 Vermeij G.J. & Snyder M.A. (2018). Proposed genus-level classification of large species of Fusininae (Gastropoda, Fasciolariidae). Basteria. 82(4-6): 57-82.

galatheae
Gastropods described in 1967